Rob Goris (16 March 1982 – 5 July 2012) was a Belgian professional road racing cyclist who rode for UCI Professional Continental Team team .

Before becoming a cyclist he competed at national level in ice hockey. He died of a heart attack in his hotel room in Rouen while visiting the 2012 Tour de France.

Major achievements

2010
 1st  National Amateur Road Race Championships
 1st Antwerpse Havenpijl

References

1982 births
2012 deaths
Belgian male cyclists
Belgian ice hockey forwards
People from Herentals
Cyclists from Antwerp Province